The 2019 Engie Open de Seine-et-Marne was a professional tennis tournament played on indoor hard courts. It was the seventh edition of the tournament which was part of the 2019 ITF Women's World Tennis Tour. It took place in Croissy-Beaubourg, France between 25 and 31 March 2019.

Singles main-draw entrants

Seeds

 1 Rankings are as of 18 March 2019.

Other entrants
The following players received wildcards into the singles main draw:
  Manon Léonard
  Alizé Lim
  Shérazad Reix

The following players received entry from the qualifying draw:
  Audrey Albié
  Cristina Bucșa
  Ulrikke Eikeri
  Cristiana Ferrando
  Julie Gervais
  Laura-Ioana Paar

Champions

Singles

 Vitalia Diatchenko def.  Robin Anderson, 6–2, 6–3

Doubles

 Harriet Dart /  Lesley Kerkhove def.  Sarah Beth Grey /  Eden Silva, 6–3, 6–2

References

External links
 2019 Engie Open de Seine-et-Marne at ITFtennis.com
 Official website

2019 ITF Women's World Tennis Tour
2019 in French tennis
Open de Seine-et-Marne